Clifford Joy "Doc" Rogers (December 20, 1897 – May 18, 1962) was an American politician who served as the 22nd governor of Wyoming from January 3, 1953 until January 3, 1955. He was a Republican
Rogers also served as State Treasurer of Wyoming twice (1946-1950, 1958-1962). As secretary of state, he succeeded to the Wyoming governorship when Governor Frank A. Barrett resigned in 1953 to join the United States Senate. Seeking a full term, Rogers lost in the 1954 Republican primary to Milward Simpson. Rogers was born in Clarion, Iowa.

See also
List of governors of Wyoming

References

1897 births
1962 deaths
State treasurers of Wyoming
Secretaries of State of Wyoming
Republican Party governors of Wyoming
People from Clarion, Iowa
20th-century American politicians